is a Japanese actor. He was born in Kanagawa Prefecture, and used to be a member of the group "JackJack".

Filmography

Television dramas
Lipstick (1999, Fuji-TV) Regular
Fly（2000, NHK）
Cosmos Angel (2002, 東海-TV) four Appearances
Dame na ri (2004, Yomiuri TV)

Television programs
Pro of ?? (2003, Yomiuri TV)

Films
Pray (2005) as Yasuda
Akiba (2006) as Toru
The Prince of Tennis Live Action Movie (2006) as Sasabe
Twilight File
Kyō Kara Hitman (2009) as Nonezumi

Video games
Siren (PS2, Japanese version) as Kyoya Suda (voice)
Siren2 (PS2, Japanese version)

Commercials
Acom Co. Ltd.
NTT DoCoMo Mobile Phones
Sapporo Cup Star (Sanyo Foods)
Final Fantasy XII (Square Enix)　　　
McDonald's
Yanlon Tea
Kurearashiru?

Music videos
Snow Dance (1999, Dreams Come True）

Theater
Getten
Soldier of Fortune
Musical "The Prince of Tennis" More Than Limit feat. St Rudolph as Yanagisawa Shinya
Musical "The Prince of Tennis" in winter 2004-2005 side Yamabuki feat. St Rudolph as Yanagisawa Shinya
Angela - Princess of Pirates as Ramon
bambino as Ken
Club Gold Zipang
bambino+ as Ken
Memory's
Musical "The Prince of Tennis" Dream Live 4th
bambino2 (due) as Ken
Sukedachi
Musical Shōnen Onmyōji

References

External links
Shinoda's Blog
JACKJACK official web site(now down)
JACK JACK Blog

1981 births
Japanese male film actors
Japanese male stage actors
Japanese male television actors
Living people